The M152 is a V8 engine produced by Mercedes-Benz from 2012 to 2015.

Design 
The M152 is essentially a naturally aspirated variant of the M157 engine and but has been revised by AMG. Compared to its predecessor, the M152 features new cylinder heads, intake manifold, and lubrication system. It also now has direct injection, and Cylinder deactivation.

Models

M152 DE55 
 2012–2015 R172 SLK 55 AMG

References 

Mercedes-Benz engines
V8 engines
Gasoline engines by model